Greatest Hits, Vol. 1: The Player Years, 1983–1988 is a double disc that contains some of the contents of Too Short's first CDs ever, recorded locally in the Bay Area around 1983–1986. All these tracks come from the pre-N.W.A era, when West Coast still had not established its sound. The album contains all of the songs featured on Don't Stop Rappin', Players and Raw, Uncut, and X-Rated, all of which have not been reissued.

Track listing
Disc 1

Disc 2

Too Short compilation albums
Jive Records compilation albums
1993 greatest hits albums